The Aguda people are the members of a community of Brazilians in Nigeria. This name is also often applied to:

 Yoruba members of the Catholic Church in Nigeria.